Freedom Cry is reggae artist Sizzla's fourth studio album, released November 11, 1998 on VP Records as Freedom Cry in the United States and as Kalonji in Europe. It features mainly conscious reggae songs, all written by Sizzla himself.

Track listing
Real - 3:49
Jah Blessing featuring Luciano - 3:48
Dem Ah Try Ah Ting - 3:52
Lovely Morning - 3:44
She's Like the Roses - 3:08
Saturated - 3:54
Love Amongst My Brethren - 3:59
Made Of - 3:53
Freedom Cry - 4:02
Long Journey - 4:10
Till It Some More - 3:48
Rain Shower - 3:45
Ancient Memories - 3:38

External links
 [ Review] at Allmusic
 Sizzla website
 VP Records website

1998 albums
Sizzla albums